Cédric Perrin (born 20 January 1974) is a French politician from The Republicans. He represents Territoire de Belfort in the French Senate.

Early life 
Perrin was born in Belfort and graduated from the University of Strasbourg.

Political career 

Perrin was Mayor of Beaucourt from 2008 to 2017. He was first elected to the French Parliament in the 2014 French Senate election.

References 

1974 births
Living people
Politicians from Belfort
Senators of Territoire de Belfort
21st-century French politicians
Mayors of places in Bourgogne-Franche-Comté
French Senators of the Fifth Republic
Union for a Popular Movement politicians
Rally for the Republic politicians
The Republicans (France) politicians
University of Strasbourg alumni